The 113th United States Colored Infantry (formerly the 6th Arkansas Colored Infantry Regiment) was an infantry regiment that served in the Union Army during the American Civil War. The regiment was composed of African American enlisted men commanded by white officers and was authorized by the Bureau of Colored Troops which was created by the United States War Department on May 22, 1863.

Organization
The regiment was organized at Little Rock, Arkansas, June 25, 1864, from the 6th Arkansas Colored Infantry and assigned to the VII Corps (Union Army).  The unit was later re-designated as the 113th United States Colored Infantry.

Service
The regiment was attached to 1st Division, 7th Corps, Dept. of Arkansas, to January, 1865. The regiment was attached to Colored Brigade, 7th Corps, until February, 1865.

General Orders No. 14, Department of Arkansas, dated February 1, 1865, from Little Rock, included the 113th United States Colored Infantry is reported as belonging to the 2nd Brigade of the 1st Division of the 7th Army Corps.

The regiment was attached to 2nd Brigade, 1st Division, 7th Corps, until April 1865. The regiment was assigned to post and garrison duty at Little Rock, Ark., for its entire term of service.

Consolidated 
The regiment was consolidated with the 11th Regiment United States Colored Infantry (Old) and the 112th U.S. Colored Infantry on April 1, 1865.  The 113th United States Colored Infantry were mustered out a year later, on April 9, 1866.

See also

 List of Arkansas Civil War Union units
List of United States Colored Troops Civil War Units
United States Colored Troops
 Arkansas in the American Civil War

Notes

References
The War of the Rebellion: A Compilation of the Official Records of the Union And Confederate Armies. Series 1, Volume 48, In Two Parts. Part 1, Reports, Correspondence, etc., Book, 1896.
Dyer, Frederick H. (1959). A Compendium of the War of the Rebellion. Sagamore Press, Inc. Thomas Yoseloff, Publisher. New York. LCCN 59-12963

External links
 The Civil War Archive
 Encyclopedia of Arkansas History
 Edward G. Gerdes Civil War Home Page
 The War of the Rebellion: a Compilation of the Official Records of the Union and Confederate Armies
 The Arkansas History Commission, State Archives, Civil War in Arkansas
 

United States Colored Troops Civil War units and formations
Units and formations of the Union Army from Arkansas
1865 disestablishments in Arkansas
Military units and formations disestablished in 1865
Military units and formations established in 1864
1864 establishments in Arkansas
Military units and formations disestablished in 1866